Afrosciadium platycarpum is a member of the carrot family, Apiaceae. It is a perennial tuberous herb, endemic to southeastern South Africa.

Afrosciadium platycarpum was previously classified as Peucedanum platycarpum before the genus Afrosciadium was established in 2008.

References

Apioideae
Endemic flora of South Africa
Plants described in 2008